Anne Fausto-Sterling ( Sterling; born July 30, 1944) is an American sexologist who has written extensively on the social construction of gender, sexual identity, gender identity, gender roles, and intersexuality. She is the Nancy Duke Lewis Professor Emerita of Biology and Gender Studies at Brown University.

Life and career
Fausto-Sterling's mother, Dorothy Sterling, was a noted writer and historian while her father was also a published writer. Fausto-Sterling received her Bachelor of Arts degree in zoology from University of Wisconsin in 1965 and her Ph.D. in developmental genetics from Brown University in 1970. After earning her Ph.D. she joined the faculty of Brown, where she was appointed Nancy Duke Lewis Professor of Biology and Gender Studies.

In a 1993 paper titled "", Fausto-Sterling laid out a thought experiment considering an alternative model of gender containing five sexes: male, female, merm, ferm, and herm.
She later said that the paper "had intended to be provocative, but I had also written with tongue firmly in cheek".

Fausto-Sterling has written two books intended for a general audience. The first of those books, Myths of Gender, was first published in 1985.
Her second book for the general public is Sexing the Body: Gender Politics and the Construction of Sexuality, published in 2000.
In the book she sets out to "convince readers of the need for theories that allow for a good deal of human variation and that integrate the analytical powers of the biological and the social into the systematic analysis of human development."

Fausto-Sterling married Paula Vogel, a Yale professor and Pulitzer-winning playwright, in 2004.
She has served on the editorial board of the journal Perspectives in Biology and Medicine and on the advisory board of the feminist academic journal Signs.
She retired from Brown University in 2014, after 44 years on the faculty.

Reception 

Historian of science Evelynn M. Hammonds describes Fausto-Sterling as one of the most influential feminist scientists of her generation. Reviewing Myths of Gender in the Los Angeles Times, Elaine Kendall writes that "Her most dramatic and valuable chapters concentrate upon the lingering educational misapprehensions operating to keep women away from the 'hard' sciences and out of such lucrative fields as engineering, sidetracking them instead into lower-paying careers in the humanities or in the 'nurturant' professions." Publishers Weekly describes Fausto-Sterling's work as "insightful", stating that Sexing the Body "offers profound challenges to scientific research, the creation of social policy and the future of feminist and gender theory."

Fausto-Sterling’s sexual continuum argument has not gained the same prominence in the biological sciences as it has in gender studies. French anthropologist Priscille Touraille called Fausto-Sterling an isolated case which has failed to create a consensus or controversy among biologists. Physician and psychologist Leonard Sax criticized Fausto-Sterling's theory of a sexual continuum. He also argued that her claim that around 1.7% of births are intersex is incorrect, because most of the conditions she considered intersex are not considered intersex from a clinical perspective. Philosopher of science David N. Stamos argued that Fausto-Sterling's theory of a sexual continuum is problematic because sex, for Stamos, is defined by gamete type. The psychologist Suzanne Kessler, in her book Lessons from the Intersexed, criticized Fausto-Sterling's analysis in "The Five Sexes" because it "still gives genitals...primary signifying status and ignores the fact that in the everyday world gender attributions are made without access to genital inspection." Kessler further commented that "What has primacy in everyday life is the gender that is performed, regardless of the flesh's configuration under the clothes." In a later paper titled "The Five Sexes, Revisited", Fausto-Sterling wrote that she now agreed with Kessler's objections to the five-sex theory.

Publications

Books

Book chapters

See also
 Feminist sexology

References

Further reading
 
 
 
  (Review of Myths of Gender.)
 
  (Review of Sexing the Body.)

External links

 
 Brown University research profile
 Brown University faculty profile
 Anne Fausto-Sterling Papers - Pembroke Center Archives, Brown University
 

1944 births
20th-century American biologists
20th-century American women scientists
20th-century American LGBT people
21st-century American biologists
21st-century American women scientists
21st-century LGBT people
Activists from New York City
American feminist writers
American geneticists
American sexologists
Brown University faculty
Feminist theorists
Gender studies academics
Intersex and medicine
LGBT academics
LGBT people from New York (state)
American LGBT rights activists
American LGBT scientists
Living people
Scientists from New York City
Transgender studies academics
University of Wisconsin–Madison College of Letters and Science alumni
Women sexologists